Minuscule 703 (in the Gregory-Aland numbering), is a Greek minuscule manuscript of the New Testament, on parchment. Palaeographically it has been assigned to the 11th century. The manuscript has complex contents. Scrivener labelled it by 885e.

Description 

The codex contains the text of the four Gospels on two volumes, 199 + 210 parchment leaves (size ).

The text is written in one columns per page, 18 lines per page.

There is also a division according to the Ammonian Sections (in Mark 234, 16:9), with a references to the Eusebian Canons.

Text 

Kurt Aland the Greek text of the codex did not place in any Category.

According to the Claremont Profile Method it represents mixed Byzantine text, related to the textual family Kx in Luke 1, Luke 10, and Luke 20.

It lacks the Pericope Adulterae (John 7:53-8:11).

History 

According to the colophon the manuscript was written in 1251.

Currently the manuscript is dated by the INTF to the 11th century.

It was added to the list of New Testament manuscript by Scrivener (885) and Gregory (703). Gregory saw the manuscript in 1883.

Formerly it was housed in London, in Quaritch (1251). In 1900 Gregory stated that the place of housing of the manuscript is unknown. In 1915 the manuscript was found in United States.

Actually the manuscript is housed at the Huntington Library (HM 1081) in San Marino, California.

See also 

 List of New Testament minuscules
 Biblical manuscript
 Textual criticism
 Minuscule 2284

References

Further reading 
 Edgar J. Goodspeed, The Bixby Gospels, HLS 4 (1915), pp. 121–125.
 Kenneth W. Clark, A Descriptive Catalogue of Greek New Testament Manuscripts in America (Chicago, 1937), pp. 119–121.

Greek New Testament minuscules
11th-century biblical manuscripts